Radmila Petrović née Miljanić, (born 19 April 1988) is a retired Montenegrin handball player. She played for ŽRK Budućnost Podgorica and the Montenegrin national team, and participated at the 2011 World Women's Handball Championship in Brazil and at the 2012 Summer Olympics, where Montenegro won silver. She won the Champions League in 2012 and 2015.

Individual awards
 Team of the Tournament Right Wing of the Bucharest Trophy: 2014

References

External links

1988 births
Living people
Montenegrin female handball players
Olympic silver medalists for Montenegro
Olympic medalists in handball
Olympic handball players of Montenegro
Handball players at the 2012 Summer Olympics
Handball players at the 2016 Summer Olympics
Sportspeople from Podgorica
Medalists at the 2012 Summer Olympics
Sportspeople from Nikšić
Mediterranean Games medalists in handball
Mediterranean Games bronze medalists for Montenegro
Competitors at the 2009 Mediterranean Games